The O 2-class submarine consisted of four submarines built by Koninklijke Maatschappij De Schelde in Flushing for the Royal Netherlands Navy. Used for patrols in the Dutch home waters. The class comprised O 2, O 3, O 4 and O 5.

Construction

References

Bibliography

External links
Description of class